The Symphony in D major, Op. 23, is the only work in this genre by the Bohemian-born composer Jan Václav Voříšek. He wrote it in 1821 at age 30; he died young, at only 34.

The dedication to Aloys von Fuchs was inscribed in the composer's own hand on 14 April 1823.

It is scored for a standard classical orchestra typical of late Haydn or early Beethoven symphonies: 2 flutes, 2 oboes, 2 clarinets, 2 bassoons, 2 horns, 2 trumpets, timpani and strings. Indeed, it has often been compared to early Beethoven, although it was written only six years before that master's death, 16 months after Voříšek.  He was a friend of Schubert and may well have been influenced by that composer as well.

The Symphony in D is Voříšek's most famous work, and is the first major Czech contribution to the 19th century symphonic literature.

The movements are:
 Allegro con brio
 Andante
 Scherzo: Allegro ma non troppo
 Finale: Allegro con brio.

Recordings
The Symphony in D has been recorded by:
 Czech National Symphony Orchestra under Paul Freeman
 Czech Philharmonic under Karel Ančerl
 Deutsche Kammerphilharmonie under Thomas Hengelbrock
 New Philharmonia Orchestra under Michael Bialoguski
 Prague Philharmonia under Jiří Bělohlávek
 Scottish Chamber Orchestra under Sir Charles Mackerras
 West German Sinfonia Orchestra under Dirk Joeres.

References

External links
 Performance of the Symphony by Slovak Sinfonietta, conducted Peter Vronský, (Indian Summer in Levoča Festival, 2011), on YouTube.

1821 compositions
Vorisek
Compositions by Jan Václav Voříšek
Compositions in D major